Chehreh Gosha (also Romanized as Chehreh Goshā) is a village in Bakeshluchay Rural District, in the Central District of Urmia County, West Azerbaijan Province, Iran. At the 2006 census, its population was 243, in 61 families.

References 

Populated places in Urmia County